Davidson Glacier is a glacier in the Holland Range, flowing north along the east side of Longstaff Peaks into the Ross Ice Shelf. Mapped by the United States Geological Survey (USGS) from tellurometer surveys (1961-62) and Navy air photos (1960). Named by Advisory Committee on Antarctic Names (US-ACAN) for Commander E. A. Davidson, U.S. Navy, Commanding Officer of the USS Edisto during U.S. Navy Operation Deepfreeze 1963.

References

Glaciers of Antarctica